MMOV may reference to:

Acronyms
Multi-mission Offshore Vessel, a class of Philippine-manufactured ships listed among the floating assets of the Philippines' Bureau of Fisheries and Aquatic Resources, primarily intended to guard Philippine waters against illegal fishing.

Ships
 DA BFAR MMOV 5001 - One of the two recently launched lead ships in the Philippines' Bureau of Fisheries and Aquatic Resources' MMOV class.
 DA BFAR MMOV 5002 - One of the two recently launched lead ships in the Philippines' Bureau of Fisheries and Aquatic Resources' MMOV class.